Lithuania competed at the 2014 Summer Youth Olympics, in Nanjing, China from 16 August to 28 August 2014.

Medalists

Athletics

Lithuania qualified three athletes.

Qualification Legend: Q=Final A (medal); qB=Final B (non-medal); qC=Final C (non-medal); qD=Final D (non-medal); qE=Final E (non-medal)

Boys
Track & road events

Field Events

Basketball

Lithuania qualified a boys' team based on the 1 June 2014 FIBA 3x3 National Federation Rankings.

Skills Competition

Boys' tournament

Roster
 Jonas Lekšas
 Martynas Sajus
 Justas Važalis
 Kristupas Žemaitis

Group Stage

Knockout Stage

Beach volleyball

Lithuania qualified a team by being the highest ranked nation not yet qualified.

Canoeing

Lithuania qualified one boat based on its performance at the 2013 World Junior Canoe Sprint and Slalom Championships.

Boys

Cycling

Lithuania qualified a girls' team based on its ranking issued by the UCI.

Team

Mixed Relay

Modern pentathlon

Lithuania qualified one athlete based on its performance at the European YOG Qualifiers and another based on its performance at the 2014 Youth A World Championships.

Rowing

Lithuania qualified two boats based on its performance at the 2013 World Rowing Junior Championships.

Qualification Legend: FA=Final A (medal); FB=Final B (non-medal); FC=Final C (non-medal); FD=Final D (non-medal); SA/B=Semifinals A/B; SC/D=Semifinals C/D; R=Repechage

Swimming

Lithuania qualified four swimmers.

Boys

Girls

Mixed

Tennis

Lithuania qualified one athlete based on the 9 June 2014 ITF World Junior Rankings.

Singles

Doubles

References

2014 in Lithuanian sport
Nations at the 2014 Summer Youth Olympics
Lithuania at the Youth Olympics